St. John's Church was a Victorian parish Church of England church in the village of Gamblesby, Cumbria, England.

The Gothic Revival-style church, with tall spire, lancet windows and external buttresses, was built as a chapel-of-ease to the church at Addingham, in response to the local growth of Methodism, in 1868, on land granted by the Duke of Devonshire at the behest of its first vicar, the Reverend Brown. The construction cost £1075 19s 10d (£1075.99), raised through voluntary contributions.

Its geometrical and floral three-light East apse, by John Scott was its only stained glass.

After being decommissioned, the grade II-listed building was converted into a private residence, in 2010–2011. The conversion featured in George Clarke's Channel 4 television series The Restoration Man.

References

External links 

 2010 planning application for the conversion

Gamblesby, St. John's Church
Gothic Revival architecture in Cumbria
Victorian architecture in England
Former Church of England church buildings
St John's Church
Gothic Revival church buildings in England